The synchronised swimming competitions at the 2017 Southeast Asian Games in Kuala Lumpur took place at National Aquatic Centre in Bukit Jalil. It was one of four aquatic sports at the Games, along with diving, swimming and water polo.

The 2017 Games featured competitions in five events.

Events
The following events were contested:

Schedule

Participation

Participating nations

Medal summary

Medal table

Medalists

References

External links